al-Khansa was a 7th-century female Arabic poet.

Khansa(a) may also refer to:

 al-Khansaa (magazine), a women's online magazines published by al-Qaeda
 al-Khansaa Brigade, an all-women police force of the jihadist Islamic State of Iraq and the Levant
 Khansa (crater), a crater on Mercury 
 Khansá, a medieval Arabic name for Hangzhou

See also 
 Khamsa (disambiguation)
 Hansa (disambiguation)
 Kansa (disambiguation)